Roseman is a surname. Notable people with the surname include:

Chief Roseman (1856–1938), American Major League Baseball player from Brooklyn, New York
Edward Roseman (1875–1957), American actor, primarily during the silent film era
Harry Roseman (born 1945), sculptor, photographer, draftsman, practitioner of web based works, and professor of art at Vassar College
Howie Roseman (born 1975), the general manager for the Philadelphia Eagles of the National Football League
Jordan Roseman (aka DJ Earworm), a San Francisco-based mashup artist
Josh Roseman, American jazz trombonist
Leonard Roseman (1924–2008), American film, television and concert composer
Mark Roseman (born 1958), English historian of modern Europe with particular interest in The Holocaust
Stevie "Keys" Roseman (Steve Roseman), a keyboardist and performer born in Oakland, California
Saul Roseman (1921–2011), an American biochemist at Johns Hopkins University

See also
Roseman Covered Bridge, historic covered bridge in Winterset, Iowa
Roseman University of Health Sciences, private, non-profit university located in the city of Henderson, Nevada

Jewish surnames